List of Guggenheim Fellowships awarded in 1927. Sixty-three fellowships were awarded to representatives of 22 states.

1927 U.S. and Canadian Fellows

See also
 Guggenheim Fellowship
 List of Guggenheim Fellowships awarded in 1926
 List of Guggenheim Fellowships awarded in 1928

References
 

1927
1927 awards